The Deriugina School, also known as the Deriugins' School is a rhythmic gymnastics club in Kyiv, Ukraine. It is run by the mother and daughter team of Albina Deriugina, who is the head coach, and Irina Deriugina, who acts as the assistant coach. Irina's daughter, Ireesha Blokhina, works in the school as a senior choreographer.

Every year since 1992 the club plays host to the biggest rhythmic gymnastics competition in Ukraine, The Deriugina Cup (Кубок Дерюгіної).

The main training centre of the club is the October Palace in Kyiv.

History 
In the 1970s Deriugina gymnasts comprised the majority of the Soviet team with the Deriugina gymnasts becoming Soviet, European and World champions. During this era the most notable individual gymnast was, Irina Deriugina — the 1977 and 1979 World champion. The school was very strong in the groups discipline during this period with European and World titles for the group, consisting of Viktoria Serykh, Olga Plokhova, Ludmila Yevtushenko, Olga Shchegoleva, Zhanna Vasyura and Irina Deriugina.

Ten years after the school's initial success, it had a few more champions to give. Aleksandra Timoshenko become the Bronze medal winner at the 1988 Olympics and the Champion at 1992 Olympics. She became the role model for the über-waif rhythmic gymnast look. Along with Timoshenko, the school produced Oksana Skaldina who went on to claim the bronze medal at the 1992 Summer Olympics, with Timoshenko taking the gold.

Throughout the 1990s the Deriugina School produced numerous champions and gymnasts of interest. Gymnasts such as Ekaterina Serebrianskaya and Elena Vitrichenko dominated the mid-1990s. The school had a big emergence of talent in the late 1990s and early 2000s led by Tamara Yerofeeva and the daughter of Viktoria Serykh, Anna Bessonova.

During the late 2013/early 2014 Euromaidan-protest in Kyiv, the school changed training halls several times and their main training centre October Palace became occupied by protesters. According to Deriugins School pupil Ganna Rizatdinova after Euromaidan they discovered that school equipment "like a TV set and a kettle, balls and clubs" had disappeared; "it was a strange kind of robbery. We don’t know who did it.”

Notable alumni
 Irina Deriugina - 1977 All around World Champion, 1979 All around World Champion.
 Olexandra Tymoshenko - 1992 All around Olympic Champion, 1988 All around European Champion (shared with Adriana Dunavska & 
 Oksana Skaldina - 1991 All around World Champion, 1992 All around Olympic bronze medalist
 Ekaterina Serebrianskaya - 1995 European Cup Final Champion, 1995 All around World Champion (with Maria Petrova), 1996 All around European Champion, 1996 All around Olympic Champion.
 Victoria Stadnik - 1995 World Championships Teams Competition bronze medalist.
 Tamara Yerofeeva - 2001 All around World Champion, 2002 World Cup Final All around winner, 2002 All around European Silver medalist, 2001 All around World Universiade winner
 Anna Bessonova - 2007 All around World Champion, two-time All around Olympic bronze medalist (2004 Athens, 2008 Beijing)
 Natalia Godunko - 2005 European Champion in ribbon and 2006 World Cup Final Champion in rope.
 Alina Maksymenko - 2013 World Championship 3rd in final clubs.
 Ganna Rizatdinova - 2016 Olympic bronze medalist, 2013 World All around silver medalist, Gold medal in hoop.
 Viktoriia Mazur -  3 time World Team Competition bronze medalist. 
 Anastasiia Mulmina - 3 time Universiade medalist
 Eleonora Romanova - 2014 World Championships Teams Competition bronze medalist (with Ganna Rizatdinova and Viktoria Mazur).
 Olena Diachenko - 2 time Grand Prix Final medalist
 Kateryna Lutsenko - 2 time Universiade medalist

See also
 Ukrainian Federation of Rhythmic Gymnastics

References

External links
Site About Deriugina Cup, the Deriugina School and Ukrainian Rhythmic Gymnastics
Deriugina School 　― Ideal Style of Rhythmic Gymnastics 　by Takako Kobayashi

Rhythmic gymnastics
Gymnastics in Ukraine